Uftyuga may refer to several rivers in Northern Russia:

 Uftyuga (Northern Dvina), a tributary of the Northern Dvina in Arkhangelsk Oblast
 Uftyuga (Sukhona), a tributary of the Sukhona in Vologda Oblast
 Uftyuga (Kokshenga), a tributary of the Kokshenga in Vologda Oblast
 Uftyuga (Lake Kubenskoye), a tributary of Lake Kubenskoye in Vologda Oblast